Mesosa undata is a species of beetle in the family Cerambycidae. It was described by Johan Christian Fabricius in 1792, originally under the genus Lamia. It is known from Java and Laos.

References

undata
Beetles described in 1792